Situation theory provides the mathematical foundations to situation semantics, and was developed by writers such as Jon Barwise and Keith Devlin in the 1980s. Due to certain foundational problems, the mathematics was framed in a non-well-founded set theory. One could think of the relation of situation theory to situation semantics as like that of type theory to Montague semantics.

Basic types
Types in the theory are defined by applying two forms of type abstraction, starting with an initial collection of basic types.

Basic types:
TIM: the type of a temporal location
LOC: the type of a spatial location
IND: the type of an individual
RELn: the type of an n-place relation
SIT: the type of a situation
INF: the type of an infon
TYP: the type of a type
PAR: the type of a parameter
POL: the type of a polarity (i.e. 0 or 1)

Infons are made of basic types.
For instance: If l is a location, then l is of type LOC, and the infon
<<of-type, l, LOC, 1>>
is a fact.

See also
 State of affairs (philosophy)

References
 Jon Barwise. "Situations and small worlds", in: In The Situation in Logic, number 17 in CSLI Lecture Notes, pp. 79–92, 1987.
 Keith Devlin. Logic and Information, pp. 49–51, 1991.

Further reading
 Edward N. Zalta. "Twenty-Five Basic Theorems in Situation and World Theory", Journal of Philosophical Logic 22 (1993): 385–428.

Semantics